Joe Baiza & The Universal Congress Of is the debut studio album of free jazz ensemble Universal Congress Of, released in 1987 through SST.

Track listing

Personnel 
Adapted from the Joe Baiza & The Universal Congress Of liner notes.

Universal Congress Of
Joe Baiza – guitar
Mike Demers – bass guitar
Jason Kahn – drums
Paul Uriaz – guitar

Production and additional personnel
David Amico – cover art, illustrations

Release history

References

External links 
 Joe Baiza & The Universal Congress Of at Discogs (list of releases)

1987 debut albums
SST Records albums
Universal Congress Of albums